Bald Mountain is a prominent peak in Northeastern Pennsylvania which stands above the Wilkes-Barre and Scranton area (also known as the Wyoming Valley). On the summit is an outcrop of Catskill conglomerate (Devonian age) known as the "Pinnacle Rock". From the summit you may view the northernmost extension of the geologic province known as the Glaciated Low Plateaus section. The mountain itself is in the Ridge and Valley Appalachians. It is a great place for photography.

To access the summit you can take the Pinnacle Rock trail. The trailhead is on the west side of the mountain and is a nine hundred foot vertical gain.

References
Alan R. Geyer (1979) "Outstanding Geologic Features of Pennsylvania", Geological Survey of Pennsylvania

 

Mountains of Pennsylvania
Landforms of Lackawanna County, Pennsylvania